Homosexuality test may refer to:
 GCC homosexuality test, a proposed test that would be executed at the border control of Kuwait and other member states of the Cooperation Council for the Arab States of the Gulf.
 Fruit machine (homosexuality test), a test measuring pupil dilatation when exposed to pornography

Homophobia
Male homosexuality